The following is a partial list of the "D" codes for Medical Subject Headings (MeSH), as defined by the United States National Library of Medicine (NLM).

This list continues the information at List of MeSH codes (D04). Codes following these are found at List of MeSH codes (D06). For other MeSH codes, see List of MeSH codes.

The source for this content is the set of 2006 MeSH Trees from the NLM.

– macromolecular substances

– dendrimers

– multiprotein complexes

– amyloid

– dystrophin-associated protein complex

– light-harvesting protein complexes
  – phycobilisomes

– molecular motors

– multienzyme complexes
  – cytochrome b6f complex
  – plastoquinol-plastocyanin reductase
  – electron transport complex i
  – electron transport complex iv
  – fatty acid synthetase complex
  – glycine decarboxylase complex
  – aminomethyltransferase
  – dihydrolipoamide dehydrogenase
  – glycine decarboxylase complex h-protein
  – glycine dehydrogenase (decarboxylating)
  – ketoglutarate dehydrogenase complex
  – dihydrolipoamide dehydrogenase
  – phosphoenolpyruvate sugar phosphotransferase system
  – photosystem i protein complex
  – photosystem ii protein complex
  – proteasome endopeptidase complex
  – pyruvate dehydrogenase complex
  – dihydrolipoamide dehydrogenase
  – dihydrolipoyllysine-residue acetyltransferase
  – pyruvate dehydrogenase (lipoamide)
  – succinate cytochrome c oxidoreductase
  – electron transport complex ii
  – succinate dehydrogenase
  – electron transport complex iii
  – sucrase-isomaltase complex

– polymers

– biopolymers
  – chitin
  – chitosan
  – collagen
  – fibrillar collagens
  – collagen type i
  – collagen type ii
  – collagen type iii
  – collagen type v
  – collagen type xi
  – elastin
  – glucans
  – cellulose
  – cellulose, oxidized
  – lignin
  – dextrans
  – glycogen
  – liver glycogen
  – starch
  – inulin
  – gum arabic
  – intermediate filament proteins
  – desmin
  – glial fibrillary acidic protein
  – keratin
  – neurofilament proteins
  – vimentin
  – karaya gum
  – latex
  – lignin
  – microfilament proteins
  – actin capping proteins
  – capz actin capping protein
  – tropomodulin
  – actinin
  – Actin depolymerizing factors
  – cofilin 1
  – cofilin 2
  – destrin
  – actin-related protein 2-3 complex
  – actin-related protein 2
  – actin-related protein 3
  – actins
  – cortactin
  – gelsolin
  – myosins
  – myosin heavy chains
  – myosin light chains
  – myosin subfragments
  – myosin type i
  – myosin type ii
  – cardiac myosins
  – atrial myosins
  – ventricular myosins
  – nonmuscle myosin type iia
  – nonmuscle myosin type iib
  – skeletal muscle myosins
  – smooth muscle myosins
  – myosin type iii
  – myosin type iv
  – myosin type v
  – profilins
  – tropomyosin
  – troponin
  – troponin c
  – troponin i
  – troponin t
  – wiskott-aldrich syndrome protein family
  – wiskott-aldrich syndrome protein
  – wiskott-aldrich syndrome protein, neuronal
  – microtubule proteins
  – tubulin
  – pectins
  – resins, plant
  – amber
  – balsams
  – propolis
  – reticulin
  – rubber
  – silk
  – tannins
  – hydrolyzable tannins
  – proanthocyanidins
  – tragacanth

– colestipol

– cyanoacrylates
  – enbucrilate
  – bucrylate

– elastomers
  – polyurethanes
  – rubber
  – neoprene
  – silicone elastomers

– fluorocarbon polymers
  – polytetrafluoroethylene
  – proplast

– glass

– hexadimethrine

– plastics

  – nylons
  – polyethylenes
  – polyethylene
  – polyethyleneimine
  – polypropylenes
  – polystyrenes
  – cholestyramine
  – polyurethanes
  – polyvinyls
  – polyvinyl alcohol
  – polyvinyl chloride
  – povidone
  – povidone-iodine
  – resins, synthetic
  – acrylic resins
  – polymethacrylic acids
  – methyl methacrylates
  – methyl methacrylate
  – polymethyl methacrylate
  – polyhydroxyethyl methacrylate
  – bone cements
  – composite resins
  – bisphenol a-glycidyl methacrylate
  – compomers
  – epoxy resins
  – resin cements

– polyanetholesulfonate

– polyanhydrides

– polyesters
  – polydioxanone
  – polyethylene terephthalates
  – polyglactin 910
  – polyglycolic acid

– polyethylene glycols
  – cetomacrogol
  – hydrogel
  – nonoxynol
  – octoxynol
  – poloxalene
  – poloxamer
  – polyhydroxyethyl methacrylate
  – polysorbates

– polygeline

– polyphloretin phosphate

– pyran copolymer

– rubber

– siloxanes
  – silicones
  – dimethylpolysiloxanes
  – simethicone
  – silicone elastomers
  – silicone gels
  – silicone oils

The list continues at List of MeSH codes (D06).

D05